Garden State Life Insurance Company is a small direct life insurance company located in League City, Texas.  It is a wholly owned subsidiary of the Galveston, Texas based American National Insurance Company.

The company celebrated its 50-year anniversary in 2006, but has not been located in New Jersey, nicknamed the garden state, in many years.  The company was previously a subsidiary of GEICO but was bought by American National in the early 1990s and moved from Maryland to Texas.

Garden State Life has made a name for itself over the years by featuring personalities Barry Van Dyke (son of Dick Van Dyke), Mickey Rooney and his wife Jan, and most recently Meredith Baxter in its television commercials.  It has also been featured in the United States Postal Service change of address packet since 1998.

League City, Texas
Life insurance companies of the United States
Insurance companies based in Texas
Financial services companies established in 1956